At least five ships of the Royal Danish Navy have borne the name HDMS Triton:

 HDMS Triton (1790) a 30 gun frigate designed by E.W.Stibolt
  HDMS Triton (1913)
  an  launched in 1915 and sold for scrapping in 1946.
  a  launched in 1954 and decommissioned in 1981.
  a  launched in 1990.

Royal Danish Navy ship names